Prayat Pongdam (October 28, 1934 – 2014) was a Thai artist.

Biography
Prayat Pongdam was born on 28 October 1934 in Sing Buri, Thailand. He attended the Poh-Chang Academy of Arts and Silpakorn University and earned a bachelor's degree in painting. Later, he went to Italy to complete a diploma from L'Accademia di Belle Art, Rome.

He died in 2014 at the age of 79.

Recognition
 National Artist in Printmaking Art (1998)

Literary works
 "Mahajanaka"

References

1934 births
2014 deaths
Thai artists
National Artists of Thailand